Ozark High School is a high school in Ozark, Missouri. Ozark High School is an International Baccalaureate World School.

Athletics

Football

Basketball

Mens

Womens

References

External links 

 

1923 establishments in Missouri
Schools in Missouri